Romal Jordan Palmer (born 30 September 1998) is an English professional footballer who plays as a midfielder for Göztepe.

Early life
Palmer was born and raised in Wigan, Greater Manchester.

Career

Barnsley
After a decade with Manchester City's academy, he was released in 2016, and joined Barnsley. He signed an 18-month professional contract with Barnsley in January 2017. In July 2018, he signed a one-year contract extension with Barnsley. On 21 December 2018, Palmer joined National League North club Darlington on a one-month loan. On 23 January 2019, Palmer's loan at Darlington was extended until the end of the seasons. He made 18 appearances on loan at Darlington. In May 2019, Palmer signed a new contract with Barnsley until summer 2020.

In May 2020, Barnsley announced that Palmer had signed a new two-year contract with the club. Palmer made his debut for Barnsley on 20 June 2020 against Queens Park Rangers in the EFL Championship. He made 3 league appearances during the 2019–20 season. Palmer made a first-team breakthrough during the 2020–21 season, making 36 league appearances. He scored his first goal for Barnsley in a 2–1 defeat to Blackburn Rovers on 28 November 2020. Despite starting his career as an attacking midfielder, Palmer was used mainly as a holding midfielder during the 2020–21 season as Barnsley finished 5th in the Championship, qualifying for the play-offs. He played in both legs of their play-off semi-final defeat to Swansea City.

Barnsley manager Valerien Ismael and Palmer's midfield partner Alex Mowatt both left the club in summer 2021, leaving Palmer as the oldest midfielder in Barnsley's squad. He made 33 appearances for Barnsley during the 2021–22 season, scoring once against Millwall, in what the Barnsley Chronicle described as a "very tough campaign" for Palmer. Barnsley were relegated to EFL League One after a 24th-place finish in the Championship.

Göztepe
On 1 July 2022, Palmer joined TFF First League club Göztepe after seven years at Barnsley.

Career statistics

References

External links

1998 births
Living people
English footballers
Footballers from Wigan
Association football midfielders
Manchester City F.C. players
Barnsley F.C. players
Darlington F.C. players
Göztepe S.K. footballers
National League (English football) players
English Football League players
English expatriate footballers
Expatriate footballers in Turkey
English expatriate sportspeople in Turkey